The following article presents a summary of the 1998 football (soccer) season in Brazil, which was the 97th season of competitive football in the country.

Campeonato Brasileiro Série A

Quarterfinals

Semifinals

Final

Corinthians declared as the Campeonato Brasileiro champions by aggregate score of 5-3.

Relegation
The four worst placed teams, which are América-MG, Goiás, Bragantino and América-RN, were relegated to the following year's second level.

Campeonato Brasileiro Série B

Gama declared as the Campeonato Brasileiro Série B champions.

Promotion
The two best placed teams in the final stage of the competition, which are Gama and Botafogo-SP, were promoted to the following year's first level.

Relegation
The six worst teams among the two worst placed teams in each one of the four groups in the first stage, which were Atlético Goianiense, Náutico, Volta Redonda, Americano, Fluminense and Juventus, were relegated to the following year's third level.

Campeonato Brasileiro Série C

Avaí declared as the Campeonato Brasileiro Série C champions.

Promotion
The two best placed teams in the final stage of the competition, which are Avaí and São Caetano, were promoted to the following year's second level.

Copa do Brasil

The Copa do Brasil final was played between Palmeiras and Cruzeiro.

Palmeiras declared as the cup champions on better goal difference by aggregate score of 2-1.

Regional and state championship champions

Regional championship champions

State championship champions

Youth competition champions

Other competition champions

Brazilian clubs in international competitions

Brazil national team
The following table lists all the games played by the Brazil national football team in official competitions and friendly matches during 1998.

Women's football

Brazil women's national football team
The following table lists all the games played by the Brazil women's national football team in official competitions and friendly matches during 1998.

The Brazil women's national football team competed in the following competitions in 1998:

Domestic competition champions

References

 Brazilian competitions at RSSSF
 1998 Brazil national team matches at RSSSF
 1997-1999 Brazil women's national team matches at RSSSF

 
Seasons in Brazilian football
Brazil